Turnip Hole is an unincorporated community  in Clarion County, Pennsylvania, United States.

A post office called Turnip Hole was established in 1889, and remained in operation until it was discontinued in 1911. Turnip Hole has been noted for its colorful place name.

References

Unincorporated communities in Clarion County, Pennsylvania
Unincorporated communities in Pennsylvania